Fangyan may refer to:

Regional varieties of Chinese
Fangyan (book), Han dynasty dictionary by Yang Xiong 
Fangyan, Zhejiang, town in Yongkang, Zhejiang, China
Fangyan Formation, geological formation in Zhejiang